Nawab Zeeshan Ur Rahman (born 2 April 1989) is an Indian professional footballer who plays as a defender.

Career

Early career
Born in Kamptee, Maharashtra, Zeeshan played mainly with amateur clubs before signing with I-League 2nd Division side Mumbai Tigers F.C. in 2012. While with the club, Zeeshan played in the 2012 Durand Cup Final against Air India where the club lost on penalties. Zeeshan left the club after it disbanded in 2013.

Pune
On 13 January, 2014 it was announced that Zeeshan had signed with I-League side Pune F.C. on a three-year deal. He made his debut for the side in the club's opening Federation Cup match against Eagles on 14 January 2014. He started the match and played 80 minutes as Pune drew the match 1–1.

Career statistics

References

External links 
 I-League Profile.

1989 births
Living people
Footballers from Nagpur
Indian footballers
Pune FC players
Association football defenders